Grey spider flower may refer to:

 Grevillea bracteosa, endemic to Western Australia
 Grevillea sphacelata, endemic to Australia

Grevillea taxa by common name